Andrewartha and Trewartha are Cornish family names.

Etymology
Cornish Names says:
Nouns: 
"tre" a "town", feminine, maybe a hamlet or house
"tref: village, town", Brythonic Celt Welsh about 4-500 AD
Adjectives: 
"Wartha": "upper" (maybe higher or greater or on a hill) 
cf. "Wollas": "lower" (maybe smaller or lesser or in a valley, of the two).
Definite article: 
"An" used as: "of the", "in the", "on the", "at the", in place names. Brythonic Celt Cornish language (Dexter, p. 18).

The book mentions "Trewartha" (p. 25), and "Andrewartha" (p. 60).

The Handbook of Cornish Names states: "Trewartha" is a Cornish name meaning "Upper Farm" or "Upper Homestead".

People
Herbert Andrewartha (1907–1992), Australian research scientist in the fields of entomology, biology, zoology and animal ecology
Janet Andrewartha (born 1952), Australian actress
John Andrewartha, Cornish-born American architect and civil engineer
Roy Andrewartha, Welsh snooker player, finalist at the 1977, 1978, 1979 & 1984 World Snooker Championships
Jake Andrewartha, Australian Olympian judoka, 2014 Commonwealth Games Medalist and professional wrestler

References

Surnames